Marcos Paulo Costa do Nascimento (born 1 February 2001), known as Marcos Paulo, is a professional footballer who plays as a forward for Brazilian club São Paulo, on loan from Atlético Madrid. Born in Brazil, he represents Portugal at international level.

Club career

Fluminense 
Born in São Gonçalo, Rio de Janeiro, Marcos Paulo began his career at Fluminense, and had a release clause of €45 million at the age of 17. He was first called up to the first team for their Campeonato Brasileiro Série A game away to Santos on 27 October 2018, as several players were rested ahead of a Copa Sudamericana game against Uruguay's Nacional; he was unused in the 3–0 loss.

Marcos Paulo made his professional debut on 30 January 2019 in the Campeonato Carioca, playing the last ten minutes of a 3–0 win over Madureira at the Maracanã Stadium, in place of Bruno Silva. On 18 May he played his first game in the national league, entering at the same point in a 4–1 home win over Cruzeiro.

In the 2019 Copa Sudamericana, Marcos Paulo played seven games as Flu reached the quarter-finals. He scored his first goals on 30 July in the last 1 second leg 3–1 home win over Uruguay's Peñarol (5–2 aggregate). He scored four goals in 24 games in the domestic league that year, all towards the end of the campaign, starting with the equaliser in a 1–1 home draw with Chapecoense on 26 October; he said after the game that to not win it was a disappointment.

On 1 March 2020, Marcos Paulo scored twice in a 5–1 home win over Madureira in the first game of the Carioca season.

Atlético Madrid 
On 5 July 2021, Marcos Paulo was announced by La Liga club Atlético Madrid, joining in a free transfer and signing a five-year contract. On 24 August 2021, he joined Primeira Liga side Famalicão on a season-long loan deal.

On 1 September 2022, Marcos Paulo was loaned to Segunda División side CD Mirandés, for one year.

On 28 December 2022, Marcos Paulo officially returned to Brazil, joining Brazilian Série A club São Paulo on loan until the end of the 2023 season.

International career
Marcos Paulo is eligible to represent Portugal through his maternal grandfather, born in Vila Cova, Vila Real. He made his international debut for Portugal under-18 on 17 April 2019 as a 52nd-minute substitute for Tiago Araújo in a 1–1 home draw with France. In the following days he scored in wins over Mexico (two in a 3–1 victory) and Denmark as his team won the Porto International Tournament.

Marcos Paulo's first involvement with the under-19 team was at the 2019 Toulon Tournament. He played the first two games of a group-stage elimination, and scored in a 3–2 win over reigning champions England in Salon-de-Provence.

Career statistics

Club

Notes

References

External links

2001 births
Living people
Association football forwards
Portuguese footballers
Portugal youth international footballers
Portuguese people of Brazilian descent
Brazilian footballers
People from São Gonçalo, Rio de Janeiro
Brazilian people of Portuguese descent
Campeonato Brasileiro Série A players
Primeira Liga players

Portuguese expatriate footballers
Expatriate footballers in Spain
Portuguese expatriate sportspeople in Spain
Fluminense FC players
São Paulo FC players
Atlético Madrid footballers
CD Mirandés footballers
F.C. Famalicão players
Sportspeople from Rio de Janeiro (state)